The 2018 Men's Ice Hockey World Championships was the 82nd such event hosted by the International Ice Hockey Federation. Teams participated at several levels of competition. The competition also served as qualifications for division placements in the 2019 competition.

Championship (Top Division)

The tournament was held in Copenhagen and Herning, Denmark, from 4 to 20 May 2018.

Division I

Group A
The Group A tournament was held in Budapest, Hungary, from 22 to 28 April 2018.

Group B
The Group B tournament was held in Kaunas, Lithuania, from 22 to 28 April 2018.

Division II

Group A
The Group A tournament was held in Tilburg, Netherlands, from 23 to 29 April 2018.

Group B
The Group B tournament was held in Granada, Spain, from 14 to 20 April 2018.

Division III

The tournament was held in Cape Town, South Africa, from 16 to 22 April 2018.

Division III qualification tournament
The qualification tournament was held in Sarajevo, Bosnia and Herzegovina, from 25 to 28 February 2018 after the original hosts, Abu Dhabi, United Arab Emirates, withdrew their application to host.

References

External links
IIHF Official Website

 
World Ice Hockey Championships, Men's
IIHF Men's World Ice Hockey Championships